The Chairman  is a 1964 Soviet drama film directed by Aleksei Saltykov and starring Mikhail Ulyanov, Nonna Mordyukova and Ivan Lapikov. This film was honored with a Second Prize at All-Union Film Festival in Kiev (1966).

Plot
After World War II ends, soldier Yegor Trubnikov comes back to his native village to restore the ruined collective farm facilities. Rebuilding the kolkhoz is as hard for him as fighting the war. Becoming chairman, he charges himself with the burden of responsibility not only for the collective farm business, but also for the destiny of the people who are so close to him.

Trivia 
The film (quite unusually for a Soviet movie) contains performance of a Christian religious hymn, Nearer, My God, to Thee (at 32nd minute).

Cast
Mikhail Ulyanov as	Yegor Trubnikov
Ivan Lapikov as Semyon Trubnikov
Nonna Mordyukova as Donya Trubnikova
Vyacheslav Nevinny as Pavel Markushev
Valentina Vladimirova as Polina Korshikova
Kira Golovko as Nadya
Arkadi Trusov as Ignat Zakharovich
Vladimir Gulyaev as Ramenkov, District Party Instructor
Antonina Bogdanova as Praskovya 
Aleksandr Kashperov as Shiryaev, Blacksmith
Aleksei Krychenkov as Alyoshka Trubnikov 
Larisa Blinova as Liza
Nikolai Parfyonov as Klyagin, First Secretary of the District Party Committee 
Aleksandr Galchenkov as Boris 
Vladimir Etush as Colonel Kaloyev
Sergei Kurilov	as Kochetkov
Sergei Blinnikov as Serdyukov
Mikhail Kokshenov as Misha
Yelizaveta Kuzyurina as Motya Postnikova
Varvara Popova as Samokhina
Vitali Solomin as Valyozhin, Physician

References

External links
 
  The Chairman. Kino-teatr.ru 

1964 films
Mosfilm films
1960s Russian-language films
Soviet drama films
Russian drama films
Films set in the 1940s
1964 drama films
Films based on works by Yuri Nagibin
Films directed by Alexey Saltykov